Ustren is a village in the Kardzhali Province, southern Bulgaria.  it had 296 inhabitants. The population is 100% Turkish. The Turkish name for the village is Ustra.

The village is situated in a mountainous area in the eastern Rhodopes 11 km to the south-west of Dzhebel. There is a school and a chitalishte. It is famous for the Medieval fortress of Ustra, located 4 km to the south of the village.

See also
List of villages in Kardzhali Province

Villages in Kardzhali Province